Ashish Rana (born 25 June 1989) known professionally as "Laure" is a Nepalese rapper and Television personality. He presented his rapping through a rap battle on YouTube which gained him popularity. He was the most searched Nepalese celebrity on Google in the year 2013 .

Personal life
Ashish Rana was born on 25 June 1989 in Pokhara, Nepal. Since Grade 6, Laure developed a keen interest in rapping. He completed his school life from the LA Higher Secondary School, then his higher education from Sagarmatha College. His rapping career began through his song Mero Solta, the first song he recorded. Because of his physical appearance, his friends gave him the moniker "Laure". He is also currently one of the judges of the Reality TV Show Himalaya Roadies which began in mid-2017.

Songs

Laure has also sing Intro songs for all 4 seasons of Himalaya Roadies.

Filmography

Controversies
He was arrested in Pokhara of Kaski district on 30 December 2021 as he was found with brown sugar . He was caught red handed with a digital balance, NRs. 38,350, 5 sets of mobile phones and a scooter with plate number GA 21 PA 3323 with four other suspects. He has accepted his usage of drugs. Police sources have stated that during preliminary interrogation Laure confessed he couldn't perform on stage without taking drugs.

References

21st-century Nepalese male singers
Nepalese male actors
1989 births
Living people
People from Pokhara
Nepalese hip hop singers